Stormblade is the second novel in the Heroes trilogy of the Dragonlance novels. It was written in 1988 by Nancy Varian Berberick who also wrote many short Dragonlance stories for Dragon magazine.

Synopsis
Stormblade is a novel which tells a part of the history of the Dragonlance world.

Plot summary
Stormblade chronicles Stanach the dwarf's quest to retrieve the powerful Stormblade. Stormblade is a kingsword, a blade which is intended to break the deadlock among the council of thanes, and bring a new king to Thorbardin. Unfortunately, the blade is stolen, but when it turns up, only one dwarf is brave enough to go after it.

Stanach was an orphan. He grew up like any other dwarf, but was lucky enough to be taught the basics of smithing. Without the blade, his teacher becomes depressed, and eventually mad. Stanach sets out to find the blade for both his teacher and just to restore it.

Firstly, he meets Lavim, a kender. Together they travel, eventually being joined by the human Kelida and the elf ranger Tyorl. After many wrong turns, fights and misfortunes, they eventually make it back to Thorbardin, where the Theiwar thane is attempting to murder Hornfel, the Hylar thane to gain power over the thanes so he can rule.

After a long fight, the Theiwar thane is killed and Stormblade is restored to its rightful place. Tyorl is mortally wounded in the fight, and dies. As a mark of honor, they allow him to be buried in the garden of thanes (a great honor for dwarves, even more for an elf).

Sources
Information from Stormblade by Nancy Varian Berberick, published by Penguin Books, copyright owned by TSR inc 1988.

See also

List of Dragonlance novels

References

1988 American novels
American fantasy novels
Dragonlance novels
Dwarves in popular culture
Novels by Nancy Varian Berberick